Shadowrun is a first-person shooter video game, developed by FASA Studio for Xbox 360 and Windows Vista. The game features a buying system which is inspired by the game Counter-Strike. The game is also inspired by the role-playing game of the same name.

Gameplay

Shadowrun'''s multiplayer consisted wholly of a first person/third person deathmatch. Players chose various races with unique abilities. Additionally, a currency system dictated in-match upgrades, with each race given a different amount of starting capital. The four playable races are Human, Elf, Dwarf, and Troll. Magic was a key component to this game as well. Players could heal, damage, teleport, and summon to gain advantages over others. Additionally, gadgets,  or "tech", were obtainable through currency. Currency also allowed players to purchase new weapons.Shadowrun featured no campaign mode. If a user was without online services, they could set up bot matches and hone their skills.

Plot
According to the ancient Mayan calendar, magic is cyclical, leaving the world and returning every 5000 years. Magic enters the world, grows, peaks, and eventually retreats. When magic was last at its peak, a powerful Ziggurat was constructed near what would be modern day Santos, Brazil. The purpose of this construct is shrouded in the mists of history. Even the Chancela family, who secretly maintained the ziggurat for thousands of years, did not know its purpose, nor did they know the purpose of the strange artifact somehow connected to the ziggurat. In the millennia since its construction, the ziggurat was eventually buried, hidden in the side of a mountain. Then, on December 24, 2012, magic began returning to the world, leaving change and confusion in its wake.

The years after magic's return wrought change on a global scale. RNA Global, a powerful multinational corporation, sent a research team to Santos, Brazil. Their job was to explore and research the strange energies coming from a mountainside along one edge of Santos. Armed with an artifact from ancient times, the research team sought to channel and control the magical energies they were exploring. Instead, they caused a magical accident that destroyed half the city and brought down the mountainside, revealing the ziggurat to all. Deflecting blame for the incident to an Ork paramilitary organization, RNA retreated from the city while rethinking their strategy.

After a time, RNA Global returned to Santos, this time armed with a government contract that provided them control over the city. Vowing to keep the peace and clean up Santos, RNA's first actions were to enact martial law and declare a curfew for all citizens. The locals, still upset over the initial accident and trying to rebuild on their own, began resisting RNA's efforts. The resistance was helped greatly by the leadership of the Chancela family, who were dedicated to defending the ziggurat and recovering the artifact. Resistance turned to conflict, conflict turned to skirmish, and skirmish eventually plunged the city into all-out war. Eventually, forces began to organize themselves under the Chancela family, and became known as "The Lineage".

The battle between these two sides has grown to great proportions as of 2031, as the struggle for the artifact continues between RNA Global forces and The Lineage.

Development
Three video games based on the Shadowrun universe were created throughout the 1990s: one for the SNES, one for the Sega Genesis, and one other for the Mega-CD (released only in Japan). In January 1999, Microsoft purchased FASA Interactive, acquiring the electronic rights to Shadowrun in the process. Microsoft then filed a trademark for the Shadowrun title in November 2004. Initial gameplay prototyping was done using the Halo: Combat Evolved engine while FASA Interactive worked on creating their own engine.

At E3 in May 2006, Microsoft officially revealed Shadowrun for Windows Vista and the Xbox 360. Originally, the game was set to have a single-player campaign to complement the multiplayer. FASA Studio's Bill Fulton later revealed the campaign mode was cut due to "resource constraints" and the "quality over quantity" focus of development.

Release
On September 12, 2007, FASA Studio announced its closure. On January 7, 2008, it was announced that the dedicated servers hosted by Microsoft for PC users would be available until at least the beginning of February 2008, at which time plans for their future support would be evaluated. The official Shadowrun forums were closed on January 31, 2008, and the announcement also stated the Shadowrun.com domain name would soon be transferred to Smith & Tinker, the company which licensed the electronic entertainment rights for Shadowrun from Microsoft.

On December 15, 2009, the game was made available on the Games on Demand store for Games for Windows – Live, and was the second game to allow for Windows users to play with Xbox 360 users (the first being Final Fantasy XI in 2006). A Games for Windows – Live update released on November 15, 2010, changed the voice codec used by the platform. As a result, Shadowrun players on Windows and Xbox 360 can no longer hear each other in-game (though they can still hear other players on the same platform). It was later cracked to work on Windows XP, confirming speculation that it was intentionally limited to Windows Vista.

Reception

The game received "mixed or average" reviews on both platforms according to the review aggregation website Metacritic. In Japan, where the Xbox 360 version was ported for release on June 21, 2007, Famitsu gave it a score of 28 out of 40, while Famitsu X360 gave it a score of one seven, two eights, and one seven for a total of 30 out of 40.

On June 22, 2007, FASA Studio head Mitch Gitelman provided an in-depth 40 minute interview, on the podcast KOXM, regarding the game and its critical reviews. He defended the pricing over the long term value of gameplay compared to other first-person shooters: 

Sales
As of July 31, 2007, the game sold roughly 162,000 units in North America according to NPD Group with 150,000 being in sold on the Xbox 360 and the remaining 12,000 on the PC. Upon release Shadowrun debuted as the sixth highest selling game out of 40 titles for the week ending June 2, 2007, in the United Kingdom. The game fell off the UK charts the week ending June 30, 2007.

See also1-800-Magic, a machinima series by Rooster Teeth Productions created using the Shadowrun'' engine

References

External links
 

2007 video games
First-person shooters
Games for Windows certified games
Microsoft games
Science fantasy video games
Shadowrun video games
Video games developed in the United States
Video games with cross-platform play
Video games set in Brazil
Windows games
Xbox 360 games
Multiplayer video games
Video games using Havok